The 2011 Superstars Series Portimão round was the third round of the 2011 Superstars Series. It took place on 22 May at the Algarve International Circuit.

Thomas Biagi won both races, driving a BMW M3 E92.

Classification

Qualifying

Race 1

Race 2

Standings after the event

International Series standings

Teams' Championship standings

 Note: Only the top five positions are included for both sets of drivers' standings.

References

Superstars
Superstars Series seasons